Sir Sassoon Jacob Hai David, 1st Baronet,  (11 December 1849 – 27 November 1926) was an Indian merchant who was a member of the community of Baghdadi Jews who lived in Bombay from the late 19th Century  into the 20th Century. He was a textile mill-owner and merchant who also became Chairman of the Bank of India.

Life and career
In 1867 Sir Sassoon Jacob Hai David joined the newly formed firm of his father in law, "E.D. Sassoon & Co.", which traded predominantly in India (Bombay, Karachi) and China (Hong Kong, Shanghai). In 1874 he started in Bombay his own firm, "Sassoon J. David & Co., Ltd.", which developed into a leading cotton merchant and opened branches in China (Hong Kong, Shanghai) and Japan (Kobe). But the company also dealt in Indian opium and held the Hong Kong agency for the "South British Insurance Company" (now part of IAG New Zealand).

As a wealthy businessman, he was the lead promoter of the Bank of India, founded in 1906, and became the bank's chairman. He served  as Sheriff of Bombay for 1905  and was created a baronet in 1911. He served on the council of the governor general of India, on the Imperial Legislative Council and the Bombay Municipal Corporation for twenty years, becoming its President in 1921. He was made KCSI in the 1922 Birthday Honours.

He partly financed the construction of the Gateway of India.

Family
Sir Sassoon Jacob Hai David was the son of Jacob Isaac David, a leading member of the Jewish community who was amongst the first Jews to move to Bombay. He married Hannah Sassoon, the daughter of Elias David Sassoon and granddaughter of David Sassoon. His eldest three sons predeceased him and he was therefore succeeded by his surviving son Sir Percival David, 2nd Baronet. Sir Sassoon Jacob Hai Davida brother, Abraham Aubrey J David (1854–?), was largely responsible for the successful built up of China business of "Sassoon J. David & Co., Ltd.".

Arms

See also

 David Sassoon
 Sassoon family
 David Sassoon & Co.
 E.D. Sassoon & Co.
 History of opium in China

References

External links
 

1849 births
1926 deaths
Indian bankers
Indian Jews
Indian people of Iraqi-Jewish descent
Jews and Judaism in India
Members of the Imperial Legislative Council of India
Sheriffs of Mumbai
Baronets in the Baronetage of the United Kingdom
Sassoon family
Knights Commander of the Order of the Star of India
Baghdadi Jews
Indian baronets